Campbell was a rapid transit station on the Chicago "L" Lake Street Elevated from 1893 to 1948.

History
The station opened in 1893 and closed in 1948.

Accidents and incidents
On the night of June 28, 1910, a train derailed while repair work was done to the tracks, affecting trains in both directions and causing delays of up to an hour. Passengers walked several hundred yards across the structure to the Campbell station. On the same night, a streetcar on Lake Street collided with a mail car and derailed, also delaying traffic. No injuries resulted from either accident.

Station details

Ridership
Ridership at Campbell peaked at 244,570 passengers in 1901, and last exceeded 200,000 in 1903. By 1914, it was the least-ridden station on the Lake Street Elevated except for the Randolph/Market station downtown, which was only used during rush hours, and the Lake Street's portion of Lake Street Transfer. In 1921, its ridership became even lower than that of the Lake Street's contribution to the Transfer, and except for 1926 would never exceed 100,000 passengers after that year. Ridership last exceeded 50,000 in 1930, and bottomed out at 31,440 in 1944. In its last full year of operation, 1947, it served 38,878 passengers, while for the part of 1948 it was open it served 11,609. Behind Randolph/Market, it was the lowest-ridership station at least partially manned on the entire Chicago "L" in 1947 and early 1948.

Notes

References

Works cited
 

Defunct Chicago "L" stations
1893 establishments in Illinois
1948 disestablishments in Illinois